The 2012 Rafael Nadal tennis season officially began on 2 January with the start of the 2012 ATP World Tour.

Year summary

Asian/Pacific hard court season and Australian Open

Nadal began his World Tour season at the Qatar Open. He beat Philipp Kohlschreiber and qualifier Denis Gremelmayr in rounds one and two and then won against seventh-seeded Mikhail Youzhny. In the semifinal he played poorly and lost to Gaël Monfils in two routine sets.

Australian Open
In the Australian Open Nadal began the tournament by breezing past qualifier Alex Kuznetsov of United States. The second round against Tommy Haas, who has never won a set against Rafael, was a little tighter but Nadal again advanced in three straight sets. He outwitted compatriot Feliciano López in Fourth Round and won in Quarter-final and Semi-final, he won in 4 sets against Tomáš Berdych and Roger Federer, respectively. By doing so, he has reached the Finals of all four Grand Slams consecutively. In the final, on 29 January, he was beaten by Novak Djokovic in five sets, the match being the longest ever match for a Grand Slam title. The epic final lasted 5 hours and 53 minutes. They set a new world record, breaking the latest longest major singles final between Mats Wilander and Ivan Lendl, which lasted 4 hours and 54 minutes, at the US Open in 1988.

US hard court season

At Indian Wells, Nadal made it to the semifinals, where he was beaten by Roger Federer, who went on to win the tournament. However, he won the Doubles event of the tournament for the second time in succession after beating John Isner and Sam Querrey in the final.

He also made the semifinals in Miami, but withdrew because of problems with his knee, the hard-court season taking its toll on his weak spot once again.

European clay court season and the French Open

As the clay court season started, Nadal was seeded 2nd at the 2012 Monte-Carlo Rolex Masters in April. He was troubled in his opening round by seed number 47, Nieminen of Finland, but prevailed in two sets. He then went on to clinch his 8th Monte Carlo trophy in 9 tries by beating Qualifier Mikhail Kukushkin, easing through Stanislas Wawrinka, and defeating Gilles Simon in the Semifinal, before topping World No. 1 Novak Djokovic in the final. This ended a streak of 7 straight final losses to Djokovic, which began at the 2011 Indian Wells Masters Final. Novak admitted that Nadal was just a better player, when asked whether the death of his grandfather early at the beginning of the tournament was affecting his whole play.

A day after the Monte-Carlo Rolex Masters Final, Nadal traveled to Barcelona where he received a 'bye' in the first round. His tremendous record on clay continued as he beat compatriot David Ferrer to clinch his seventh title in eight years at the Barcelona Open.

The Mutua Madrileña Madrid Open did not go very well for Nadal since he lost early in the 3R to Fernando Verdasco. Nadal stated that he was very unhappy with the new blue-colored clay and threatened not to attend in the future if the surface was not changed. Several other players such as Novak Djokovic agreed with Nadal in his criticism.

In the last tournament before the French Open Nadal went to Internazionali BNL d'Italia in Rome. He won every single match in two sets finishing with his second victory over Novak Djokovic and his third title in 2012.

French Open
At the French Open, Nadal managed to win all six matches before facing Novak Djokovic in the Final, in which Nadal won in four sets. During the entire tournament, Nadal only lost a single set (against Djokovic in the final). With his seventh championship victory at Roland Garros, Nadal became the most successful tennis player at the French Open.

Throughout the entire Clay court season, Nadal did not drop a single set on the red clay across 3 tournaments and 23 matches, which started in Monte Carlo, Barcelona, BNL d'Italia and was ended by Novak Djokovic in the Final of the French Open. He collected 5 bagels  along the way (a bagel is a score of 6–0 in a set of a tennis match).

European grass court season, Wimbledon Championships and the Summer Olympics

For the first time since his debut in 2005, Nadal revisited the Gerry Weber Open in Halle, Germany. There he enrolled in both the Doubles and Singles events. He partnered up with Marcel Granollers as his Doubles teammate as well as "hitting company." After disappointing Quarter Finals losses at both the Singles and Doubles events of the Gerry Weber, Rafael Nadal took a week off from the tour and took a visit to his hometown, Manacor.

Wimbledon Championships
Wimbledon Championships did not go well for Nadal and was a disaster for him. He lost early in the second round to Lukáš Rosol in 5 sets in one of the greatest shocks in Grand Slam history. Rosol then succumbed to Philipp Kohlschreiber in the following round. After his loss, Nadal was off into yet another rest, this time in Sardinia.

London Olympics
Nadal's second appearance at the Summer Olympics, saw him chosen by the Spanish Sports Federation as the flag-bearer of Spain. He gained automatic entry to the Men's Singles Event and was the defending champion.

But on 19 July, Nadal stated that he will be withdrawing from the Olympics citing knee injury as his issue.

Summer US hard court season
After he withdrew from the London Olympics due to knee tendinitis, Nadal missed the rest of the US Open Series, leading up to the US Open, stating that he will not return to court before the recovery.

U.S. Open
On 15 August, Nadal announced via Twitter that he was withdrawing from the 2012 US Open (tennis). He had already withdrawn from the 2012 Rogers Cup and the 2012 Western & Southern Open.

Autumn season

On 3 September, Nadal announced on his homepage that he would not play for the next two months in order to rest and allow his knee to recover. He ultimately missed the remainder of the 2012 season, having received qualification for the ATP World Tour Finals in London after his second round exit from Wimbledon, before pulling out due to injury. Despite missing the final four months of the season, Nadal managed to finish ranked No. 4 in the world, his lowest year-end ranking in eight years.

Nadal stated in his announcement: "I have missed the Olympics and the US Open in the last few weeks, two of the most important tournaments of the year and that I really wanted to play. I really want to be back competing and enjoying the tennis tour, but I have many years in front of me and my knee needs some rest. I will be back when I have no pain and able to compete with guarantee[...]."

All matches

Singles matches

Doubles matches

Tournament schedule

Singles schedule
Nadal's 2012 singles tournament schedule is as follows:

1 The symbol (i) = indoors means that the respective tournament will be held indoors. 
2 Difference between new points and previous points. ATP Points Distribution.

Yearly records

Head-to-head matchups
Ordered by number of wins

 David Ferrer 3–0
 Novak Djokovic 3–1
 Tomáš Berdych 2-0
 Marcel Granollers 2–0
 Lukáš Lacko 2–0
 Alex Kuznetsov 1–0
 Janko Tipsarević 1–0
 Denis Gremelmayr 1–0
 Tommy Haas 1–0
 Florian Mayer 1–0
 Mikhail Youzhny 1–0
 Nikolay Davydenko 1–0
 Kei Nishikori 1–0
 Radek Štěpánek 1–0
 Juan Mónaco 1–0
 David Nalbandian 1–0
 Leonardo Mayer 1–0
 Eduardo Schwank 1–0
 Jarkko Nieminen 1–0
 Mikhail Kukushkin 1–0
 Stanislas Wawrinka 1–0
 Alexandr Dolgopolov 1–0
 Simone Bolelli 1–0
 Denis Istomin 1–0
 Robert Farah 1–0
 Santiago Giraldo 1–0
 Jo-Wilfried Tsonga 1–0
 Gilles Simon 1–0
 Feliciano López 1-0
 Guillermo García López 1–0
 Nicolás Almagro 1–0
 Thomaz Bellucci 1-0
 Philipp Kohlschreiber 1–1
 Fernando Verdasco 1–1
 Roger Federer 1–1
 Lukáš Rosol 0-1
 Gaël Monfils 0–1

See also
2012 Roger Federer tennis season
2012 Novak Djokovic tennis season

References

External links 
 
ATP tour profile

2012
 
Nadal